Samuel A. White (August 10, 1823 – March 4, 1878) was an American politician.

Born in Franklin, New York, White graduated from Hamilton College. In 1845, he moved to Port Washington, Wisconsin, where he was appointed postmaster in 1853. In 1857, White served in the Wisconsin State Assembly as a Democrat. In 1861, he was appointed county judge for Ozaukee County, Wisconsin. In 1864 White was appointed Wisconsin assistant bank comptroller and moved to Whitewater, Wisconsin. In 1871–1872, White again served in the Wisconsin State Assembly. He died in Whitewater, Wisconsin.

Notes

1823 births
1878 deaths
People from Delaware County, New York
People from Port Washington, Wisconsin
People from Whitewater, Wisconsin
Hamilton College (New York) alumni
Wisconsin state court judges
Democratic Party members of the Wisconsin State Assembly
19th-century American politicians
19th-century American judges